Danut Matei, commonly known as Dan Matei, (born 30 December 1966) is a Romanian former professional footballer who played as a forward for: CIL Sighet, Universitatea Cluj, CFR Cluj, and Gloria Bistrița. After retirement Matei started his football manager career being the manager of Gloria Bistrița's second team, Gaz Metan Mediaș, CFR Cluj or ACS Dumitra.

References

External links
 
 

1966 births
Living people
People from Sighetu Marmației
Romanian footballers
Association football forwards
Liga I players
FC Universitatea Cluj players
ACF Gloria Bistrița players
Liga II players
CFR Cluj players
Romanian football managers
CS Gaz Metan Mediaș managers
CS Gloria Bistrița-Năsăud football managers